Zog or ZOG may refer to: 

 King Zog I of Albania (1895–1961), ruled 1928 to 1939
 Zionist Occupation Government conspiracy theory, an antisemitic trope
 ZOG (hypertext), an early hypertext system developed at Carnegie Mellon University during the 1970s 
 Z Owners Group, comprising riders of the Kawasaki Z series motorcycles
 Zog (children's book) by Julia Donaldson
 Zillions of Games, a commercial general game playing system developed by Jeff Mallett and Mark Lefler in 1998

Fictional entities 
 Home planet of the puppet characters Zig and Zag 
 Zog, Triceraton soldier in the Teenage Mutant Ninja Turtles universe
 Zog, robot character (whose chest bears the label "ZOG"), in the film Astro Boy (2009)
 King Zog, Bean's overbearing father in the animated series Disenchantment
 Zog, semi-humanoid sea-monster and evil magician in L. Frank Baum's fantasy novel The Sea Fairies (published 1911)

See also 
 Zod (disambiguation)